Amir Emad Mirmirani known by the nickname Jadi, is an educator, programmer, blogger and internet activist in the field of Free and open-source software and Linux in Iran. He was arrested in October 2022 amidst the Mahsa Amini protests for raising awareness about internet censorship in Iran and the role of various tech companies including Abr Arvan in it.

Background 
Jadi has a Bachelor of Science in Telecommunications engineering from the K. N. Toosi University of Technology and a master's degree in sociology from Allameh Tabataba'i University. He is an expert in Linux and Python and has worked in telecommunication companies with different big companies around the world. He is considered one of the leading lecturers of scientific courses on Python, Blockchain, Bitcoin and LPIC in Iran.

Jadi also hosts various podcasts called Radio Geek, Jadi Dot Net and Jadi Radio. He is passionate about freedom of expression and believes in human-digital rights.

Arrest 
On October 5, 2022, security forces raided his house, arrested him without showing an arrest warrant and took him to Evin Prison. His arrest was believed to be in connection with his efforts educating and warning about internet censorship and Islamic Republic's plans to establish a Cyberspace service regulation system as well as raising awareness about tech companies such as Abr Arvan that cooperate with the government of Iran to cut off Iranian users' access to the internet and provide access only to domestic networks.

Shortly after the arrest, his Twitter and Instagram accounts were deactivated. His arrest was part of a wave of arrests carried out by the Government of Iran as a result of the September 2022 Iranian protests.
He was released on bail on December 12, 2022.

See also 
‌Mahsa Amini protests
Detainees of the September 2022 Iranian protests
Human rights in Iran

Sources 

Iranian bloggers
Internet activists
Open access activists
Open content activists
Iranian podcasters
Year of birth missing (living people)
Living people